Uilke Piebe "Oeki" Hoekema (born 28 January 1949) is a Dutch retired footballer who played as a forward for Go Ahead Eagles, PSV, De Graafschap, Lierse SK, ADO Den Haag, Cambuur, and FC Wageningen, as well as the Netherlands national team.

References

External links
 Player profile at Voetbal International

Living people
1949 births
Dutch footballers
Association football forwards
Netherlands international footballers
Go Ahead Eagles players
PSV Eindhoven players
De Graafschap players
Lierse S.K. players
ADO Den Haag players
FC Wageningen players
Footballers from Leeuwarden
Dutch expatriate footballers
Dutch expatriate sportspeople in Belgium
Expatriate footballers in Belgium